Sasso Gordona is a mountain of the Lugano Prealps, located west of Lake Como. It lies in the Italian region of Lombardy, just north of the Swiss border with the canton of Ticino. It has an elevation of 1,410 metres above sea level. The Swiss border reaches a height of 1,200 metres, below Rifugio Prabello.

West of Sasso Gordona is the Rifugio Prabello, a mountain hut owned by the Italian Alpine Club.

References

External links
Sasso Gordona on Hikr

Mountains of the Alps
Mountains of Lombardy
Mountains partially in Switzerland